Tridens melanops is a species of pencil catfish endemic to Brazil where it is native to the Amazon Basin.  This species grows to a length of  SL.  This species is the only described species in its genus.

References

Trichomycteridae
Fish described in 1889
Fish of South America
Fish of the Amazon basin
Fauna of Brazil
Fish of Brazil
Endemic fauna of Brazil
Taxa named by Carl H. Eigenmann
Taxa named by Rosa Smith Eigenmann